The Legend of Yang Guifei, also known as The Secret History of Concubine Yang, is a Chinese television series loosely based on the romance between Emperor Xuanzong of the Tang dynasty and his consort Yang Yuhuan. The series was directed by You Xiaogang and starred Yin Tao and Anthony Wong as the couple. It was first broadcast on Hunan Satellite TV from April to May 2010.

Plot
Yang Yuhuan became the wife of Li Mao, a prince. Li Mao was the son of Emperor Xuanzong's favorite, Consort Wu. However, Emperor Xuanzong soon falls in love with her, and he takes her as a consort to deal with the death of Consort Wu. After being harmed several times by Consort Mei, Yang Yuhuan rises to the rank of Guifei. She is compared to Zhao Feiyan by her former lover, Li Bai, and she is reminisced by her former husband, Li Mao. This is the story of a love quadrangle consisting of Yang Yuhuan, Emperor Xuanzong, Li Bai, and Li Mao.

Cast
 Yin Tao as Yang Yuhuan / Yang Yue'er
 Zhou Xu as young Yang Yue'er
 Anthony Wong as Emperor Xuanzong of Tang
 Wang Luoyong as Li Bai
 Shi Xiaoqun as Xie A'man
 He Saifei as Consort Wu
 Michelle Ye as Yang Yuyao
 Nathan Lee as Gao Xianzhi
 Elvis Tsui as An Lushan
 Tse Kwan-ho as Yang Xuangui
 Jin Qiaoqiao as Princess Yuzhen
 Wan Ni'en as Chu Liuxiang
 Zhang Songwen as Yang Guozhong
 Wu Liping as Gao Lishi
 Xu Jian as Li Mao
 Li Nian as Yuenu
 Chi Huaqiong as Consort Mei
 Yang Mingna as Empress Wei
 Liu Can as Emperor Suzong of Tang
 Yu Qingbin as Shi Chaoyi
 Zhou Jingfeng as Li Yao
 Zhao Xuan as Li Jingzhong
 Lei Mu as Chen Xuanli
 Liu Yan as Zhang Liangdi
 Xu Min as Yang Xuanjiao
 Zhuang Jin as Yang Xuanjiao's wife
 Oyamada Sho as Watanabe Seio
 Yumi Asō as Empress Kōken

External links
  The Legend of Yang Guifei on Sina.com

2010 Chinese television series debuts
Television series set in the Tang dynasty
2010 Chinese television series endings
Chinese historical television series